"Drawn to the Rhythm" is the third single from Sarah McLachlan's album Solace. It was released on 7 February 1992, by Nettwerk in Canada. The song reached number one on the RPM Cancon chart.

The single includes two versions of "Drawn to the Rhythm" - live acoustic from MuchMusic and album mix - as well as a live version of "Gloomy Sunday" which was recorded on 18 October 1991, at the Discovery Theatre, Vancouver.

The music video for this song was directed by Sarah McLachlan herself.

Track listing

CD: Nettwerk / W2-3065 (Canada) 
 "Drawn to the Rhythm"
 "Gloomy Sunday (Live Oct. 18, 1991 Discovery Theatre, Vancouver)"
 "Drawn to the Rhythm (Live acoustic at Much Music)"

 also released on cassette 4JW-3065

Charts

Weekly charts

Year-end charts

References

1991 songs
1992 singles
Sarah McLachlan songs
Songs written by Sarah McLachlan